David Silva Guglielmeti (9 October 1917 – 21 September 1976) was a Mexican actor and occasional producer of the Golden Age of Mexican cinema. In his career, he appeared in more than 100 films and won an Ariel Award for his leading role in the film Champion Without a Crown (1946).

Selected filmography

 Bajo el cielo de México (1937)
 La Zandunga (1938) - (uncredited)
 Hombres de mar (1938) - (uncredited)
 La casa del ogro (1938) - Invitado a posada (uncredited)
 Café concordia (1939) - Julián
 Hombres del aire (1939)
 Viviré otra vez (1940) - José
 La gallina clueca (1941) - José (Pepe)
 Regalo de Reyes (1942) - Enrique
 La abuelita (1942) - Fernando
 La Isla de la Pasión (1942) - Julio
 Secreto eterno (The Eternal Secret) (1942) - Luis Navarro
 I'm a Real Mexican (1942) - Juan Fernández
 Yolanda (Brindis de amor) (1942)
 Lo que sólo el hombre puede sufrir (1942) - Miguel
 La posada sangrienta (1943) - Antonio
 Ave sin nido (Anita de Montemar) (1943) - Adolfo Muñóz
 Los miserables (1943) - Baron Mario de Pontmercy
 Tres hermanos (1943)
 Balajú (1943)
 Porfirio Díaz (1944)
 El mexicano (1944)
 La culpable (1944)
 Flor de Durazno (1945) - Fabián
 Rayando el sol (1946) - Carlos, adulto
 Campeón sin corona (1946) - Roberto 'Kid' Terranova
 Humo en los ojos (1946) - Carlos Gómez
 Me persigue una mujer (1947)
 El amor abrió los ojos (1947)
 Los que volvieron (1948) - Carlos Cervantes
 Madam Temptation (Señora tentación) (1948) - Andrés Valle
 The Flesh Commands (1948)
 A la sombra del puente (1948)
 De pecado en pecado (1948)
 Lazos de fuego (1948)
 Esquina, bajan! (1948) - Gregorio del Prado
 Revenge (1948) - Rafael
 Han matado a Tongolele (1948) - Carlos Blanco
 Una familia de tantas (A Family Like Many Others) (1949) - Roberto del Hierro
 Eterna agonía (1949) - Trinidad Reyes
 No me quieras tanto (1949) - Gustavo
 Hay lugar para... ¡dos! (1949) - Gregorio del Prado
 Angels of the Arrabal (1949) - Juan Martínez, el nene
 Rayito de luna (1949) - Julián
 Las puertas del presidio (1949) - Martin Santoyo
 Ventarrón (1949) - Ventarrón
 Cuando acaba la noche (1950) - Gabriel Moreno
 Esposa o amante (1950)
 El desalmado (1950) - Enrique Vidal
 El amor no es ciego (1950) - Pancho Kid
 Nosotras las Taquígrafas (1950) - David Martínez
 Casa de vecindad (1951) - Ramón
 Manos de seda (1951) - Jorge, manos de seda
 Los amantes (1951) - Jorge Rubio
 Radio patrulla (1951)
 Engagement Ring (1951) - Pablo Galván
 The Lovers (1951) - Julio Castro
 Los hijos de nadie (1952)
 Traigo mi 45 (1952) - Francisco Reynoso
 Póker de ases (1952) - David
 El billetero (1953) - Pedro
 Huracán Ramírez (1952) - Fernando Torres / Huracán Ramírez
 The Player (1953) - Alberto Maciel
 Reportaje (1953, dirigido por Emilio Fernández)
 Casta de roble (1954)
 Los Fernández de Peralvillo (1954) - Roberto Márquez
 Espaldas mojadas (1955) - Rafael Améndola Campuzano
 The First Texan (1956) - General Antonio Lopez de Santa Ana
 Esposa te doy (1957) - Alberto del Valle
 La edad de la tentación (1959) - Agente de ministerio público
 Ellas también son rebeldes (1961) - Comandante policía
 Tirando a matar (1961)
 El hombre de la ametralladora (1961) - Juan Morales (El Chicago)
 En busca de la muerte (1961)
 Mañana serán hombres (1961) - Reyes
 Locura de terror (1961) - Professor Jones
 El aviador fenómeno (1961) - Doctor Ingemar
 Trampa fatal (1961) - Carlos Fernández
 Los hermanos del hierro (1961) - Pelón
 Y dios la llamó tierra (1961) - Don Cosme Aguilar, presidente municipal
 Juventud rebelde (jóvenes rebeldes) (1961) - El charrascas
 El fusilamiento (1962)
 La noche del jueves (1962) - Pancho, padre de Anita
 El misterio de Huracán Ramírez (1962) - Fernando
 El barón del terror (1962) - Comandante / lead detective
 La risa de la ciudad (1963) - Rosco
 El hombre de papel (1963) - Inspector de policía
 División narcóticos (1963) - Jefe de policía (Coronel)
 El revolver sangriento (1964) - El Manso
 El mundo de las drogas (1964) - Coronel
 El charro de las calaveras (1965) - Luis Alvatierra
 Cargando con el muerto (1965)
 La recta final (1965) - Sr. Goméz
 Duelo de pistoleros (1966) - Romano
 El cachorro (1966)
 Los malditos (1966)
 El hijo de Huracán Ramírez (1966) - Fernando / Huracan Ramirez
 El secreto del texano (1966)
 Rage (1966) - Truck Driver
 El pistolero desconocido (1967) - El puma
 La mujer murciélago (1968) - No. 1 / José
 Los canallas (1968)
 La venganza de Huracán Ramirez (1969) - Huracán Ramírez
 Una horca para el texano (1969) - Señor Juez
 ¡Arriba las manos texano..! (1969)
 Enigma de muerte (1969) - Señor Robles
 Simplemente vivir (1970) - Compadre
 El topo (1970) - Coronel
 Campeones justicieros (1971) - Dr. Marius Zarkoff / Mano Negra
 Para servir a usted (1971) - Gordo
 Ya somos hombres (1971) - Papá de Germán
 Los desalmados (1971)
 Pubertinaje (1971) - (segment "Una cena de navidad")
 Tacos al carbón (1972) - El chaquiras
 Ángeles y querubines (1972) - Doctor Ismael
 The Holy Mountain (1973) - Fon's father (uncredited)
 El castillo de la pureza (1973) - Inspector
 Aquellos años (1973) - Gen. Leonardo Márquez
 Una rosa sobre el ring (1973)
 La mansión de la locura (1973) - Cult Priest
 San Simón de los Magueyes (1973) - Sr. Cura
 Fe, esperanza y caridad (1974) - Melitón (segment "Fe")
 Cântico Final (1976) - Félix
 Los albañiles (1976) - Ing. Zamora
 Alucarda, la hija de las tinieblas (1977) - Father Lázaro (final film role)

References

External links

1917 births
1976 deaths
20th-century Mexican male actors
Best Actor Ariel Award winners
Male actors from Mexico City
Mexican male film actors
Mexican film producers
Deaths from diabetes
Mexican people of French descent
Mexican people of Italian descent
Mexican people of Swiss descent